Team America may refer to:
 
 Team America: World Police, a 2004 movie created by Trey Parker and Matt Stone
 Team America (soccer), a short-lived soccer team in the North American Soccer League for the 1983 season
 Team America, a Marvel Comics superhero team, later known as the Thunderiders
 Team America PAC, a political action committee; founded by Congressman Tom Tancredo of Colorado
 Team America Rocketry Challenge (TARC), an American model rocketry competition for high school students

See also
 Team USA (disambiguation)